La ceinture du grand froid, by Nic & Cauvin, is the thirtieth album of the Spirou et Fantasio series, and the first of the authors. The story was initially serialised in Spirou magazine, before released as a hardcover album in 1983.

Story

In The Belt of Great Cold, Fantasio made the eccentric purchase of an old ship on which he, Spirou and Spip go on a journey by sea. They end up arriving in a zone in which the climate resembles the North Pole, but the three scientists living the close island explains to them that this "belt of cold" is caused artificially and that the island is fictitious also.
Thus, these scientists build an interplanetary vessel in order to flee the Earth, whose great powers try to exploit their genius with fine soldiers. Mercenaries occur, with the orders of the commander Alexander, in order to take them along, but Spirou and Fantasio manage to slow down them sufficiently a long time and the scientists flee in their making believe that they all are died.

References

 Cauvin publications in Spirou and Nic Broca publications in Spirou BDoubliées

External links
Spirou official site album index 

Spirou et Fantasio albums
Works originally published in Spirou (magazine)
Literature first published in serial form
1983 books
1983 in comics
Arctic in fiction
Nautical comics